Russell J. Blair (October 1, 1907 – March 12, 1994) was a Democratic member of the Pennsylvania House of Representatives.

References

Democratic Party members of the Pennsylvania House of Representatives
1907 births
1994 deaths
20th-century American politicians